The list of shipwrecks in November 1945 includes ships sunk, foundered, grounded, or otherwise lost during November 1945.

1 November

3 November

4 November

5 November

6 November

8 November

9 November

10 November

12 November

14 November

17 November

19 November

21 November

22 November

27 November

28 November

29 November

30 November

Unknown date

References

1945-11